The dissonant dart (Euxoa dissona) is a moth of the family Noctuidae. It is found in north-eastern North America, including Quebec, Newfoundland and Labrador, the Northwest Territories, Manitoba and New Hampshire.

External links
mothphotographersgroup

Euxoa
Moths of North America
Moths described in 1860